Seydouba is an African masculine given name. Notable people with the name include:

Seydouba Bangoura, Guinean footballer
Seydouba Cissé (born 2001), Guinean footballer
Seydouba Soumah (born 1991), Guinean footballer

African masculine given names